The Southern Necropolis is a cemetery in the Gorbals district of southern Glasgow, Scotland. It was opened in the year 1840 to provide an affordable and respectable place of burial for the people of Gorbals and the surrounding areas of the city of Glasgow. Over 250,000 individuals have been buried within the many lairs.

History
The cemetery was established in response to the crowded state of the Old Gorbals Burial Ground, on Rutherglen Road. Proposals for a new cemetery were put forward in 1839, and the following year land was purchased from William Gilmour of Oatlands. The first burial, that of a 16-month-old child, took place on 21 July 1840. There are three sections to the cemetery: Central opened in 1840; Eastern opened in 1846; and the larger Western section opened in 1850. The entrance to the cemetery is at Caledonia Road, via the grand gatehouse which was built in 1848 to designs by the Glasgow architect Charles Wilson.

In 1954 the cemetery played host to a large group of child "vampire hunters" searching for the purported "Gorbals Vampire". The incident, sparked by an urban myth that a vampire had killed two local children, was blamed on American horror comics such as Tales from the Crypt, despite none of the comics referring to the creature in question, and the ensuing moral panic led to an increase in comic censorship. In 2016, a mural which features the vampire and a brief line describing the 1950s event was created by Ella Bryson and Art Pistol. It is located in an archway on St Luke's Place, not far from Glasgow's Citizen Theatre in the Gorbals.

The Southern Necropolis was taken over by the Glasgow Corporation in 1952, and is now operated by Glasgow City Council. The cemetery is protected as a Category B listed building, while the gate lodge is listed at Category A.

Notable interments

 Sir Thomas Lipton (d. 1931), tea merchant
 Agnes Reston (d. 1856), wartime nurse
 John Robertson (d. 1987), Labour politician
 George Rodgers (d. 1870), Victoria Cross recipient
 Alexander "Greek" Thomson (d. 1875), architect
 Charles Wilson (d. 1863), architect
 Thomas B. Seath (d. 1903), shipbuilder
 Allan Glen (d. 1850), philanthropist

War graves
The Necropolis contains graves of 11 Commonwealth service personnel, 10 from World War I and one airman of World War II, registered and maintained by the Commonwealth War Graves Commission.

See also
 Burials at the Southern Necropolis
 Glasgow Necropolis, another large cemetery in the city centre

References

External links
 Southern Necropolis Research
 Southern Necropolis Heritage Trail, Glasgow City Council
 

Cemeteries in Scotland
Gorbals
Category A listed buildings in Glasgow
Category B listed buildings in Glasgow
1840 establishments in Scotland
Commonwealth War Graves Commission cemeteries in Scotland
Buildings and structures in Glasgow
Necropoleis